Frederich Christopher Herman "Pete" Schmidt (July 23, 1890 – March 11, 1973) was a Major League Baseball pitcher who played for the St. Louis Browns in .

External links
Baseball Reference.com

1890 births
1973 deaths
St. Louis Browns players
Major League Baseball pitchers
Baseball players from Iowa